The 2019 Philippine House of Representatives elections were the 35th lower house elections in the Philippines. They were held on May 13, 2019, to elect members to the House of Representatives.

Candidates were expected to be either for or against President Rodrigo Duterte. As the Philippines has a multi-party system, those who are for (or against) Duterte may find themselves running against each other. Other districts that may be seen as safe seats may see a candidate elected unopposed. Several seats have not been apportioned since 1907, gerrymandering on some newly apportioned seats and entrenchment of political dynasties make competitive races in so-called swing seats rare. The Liberal Party was expected to lead the opposition against PDP–Laban.

The pro-Duterte parties overwhelmingly won most of the seats in the House. Pro-Duterte party-list ACT-CIS emerged as the topnotcher in the party-list election. There was infighting among the pro-Duterte parties on who should be elected Speaker. Alan Peter Cayetano agreed on term-sharing with Lord Allan Jay Velasco for the speakership, with the former serving for the first 15 months, while the latter serving for the last 21 months.

Electoral system 
The Philippines uses parallel voting for its lower house elections. There are currently 297 seats in the House; 238 of these are district representatives, and 59 are party-list representatives. Philippine law mandates that there should be one party-list representative for every four district representatives. District representatives are elected under the plurality voting system from single-member districts. Party-list representatives are elected via the nationwide vote with a 2% "soft" election threshold, with a 3-seat cap. The party in the party-list election with the most votes usually wins three seats, the other parties with more than 2% of the vote two seats, and the parties with less than 2% of the vote winning a seat each if the 20% quota is not met.

Campaigning for elections from congressional districts seats are decidedly local; the candidates are most likely a part of an election slate that includes candidates for other positions in the locality, and slates may comprise different parties. The political parties contesting the election make no attempt to create a national campaign.

Party-list campaigning, on the other hand, is done on a national scale. Parties usually attempt to appeal to a specific demographic. Polling is usually conducted for the party-list election, while pollsters may release polls on specific district races. In district elections, pollsters do not attempt to make forecasts on how many votes a party would achieve, nor the number of seats a party would win; they do attempt to do that in party-list elections, though.

Participating parties

Contesting district elections

The seats held by each party were expected to change by the time candidacies were declared in late 2018.

Contesting via the party-list system
The parties under the Makabayan bloc was formerly supportive of Duterte's policies until Duterte suspended peace talks with the Communist Party of the Philippines.

Redistricting 
Reapportioning the number of seats is done via national reapportionment after the release of every census or via piecemeal redistricting for every province or city. National reapportionment has not happened since the 1987 Constitution took effect, and aside from piecemeal redistricting, the apportionment was based on the ordinance from the constitution, which was in turn based from the 1980 census.

In total, seven new district seats were created. Two were in Isabela, where the entire province was redistricted from four districts to six, and one each in Cavite, where the sixth and seventh districts were redistricted into three, Aklan and Southern Leyte, which were split into two districts, Laguna, where Calamba was separated from the second district and South Cotabato, where General Santos was separated from the first district.

As there are now 245 districts; therefore, there are 61 party-list seats (at least 20% of the total), an increase from 59. The 18th Congress shall then have 306 representatives. However, as preparations were already on its way when the laws for the creation of General Santos and Southern Leyte districts were made, the commission decided to delay elections for the four seats involved to October 2019; the ballots for those districts showed their previous conflagrations as if it were not redistricted yet. A lawsuit was then decided by the Supreme Court prior to rescheduled elections, ordering the commission to declare the winner of the election in South Cotabato's 1st district. Upon doing so, the commission then declared the winner of the unified Southern Leyte district as well. The first elections for these two districts shall be in 2022, at the next general election. This left the number of districts to 243, with still 61 party-list seats.

Retiring and term-limited incumbents

Term limited
These representatives are term-limited, and are thus not allowed to run in 2019:

Ang Asosasyon Sang Mangunguma Nga Bisaya Owa Mangunguma incumbents
Sharon Garin (party-list)
Garin denied that either she or her siblings were running for Governor of Iloilo.
Advocacy for Teacher Empowerment through Action, Cooperation, and Harmony Towards Educational Reforms, Inc. incumbents
Julieta Cortuna (party-list)
Alliance of Concerned Teachers incumbents
Antonio Tinio (party-list)
Ako Bikol incumbents
Rodel Batocabe (party-list)
Decided to run for Daraga mayor, assassinated prior to election.
Christopher Co (party-list)
Buhay Hayaan Yumabong incumbents
Mariano Michael Velarde Jr. (party-list)
Citizens' Battle Against Corruption incumbents
Sherwin Tugna (party-list)
Democratic Independent Workers Association incumbents
Emmeline Aglipay-Villar (party-list)
Gabriela Women's Party incumbents
Emmi de Jesus (party-list)
Kalinga: Advocacy for Social Empowerment and Nation Building through Easing Poverty incumbents
Abigail Faye Ferriol-Pascual (party-list)
Kusug Tausug incumbents
Shernee Tan (party-list)
Liberal Party incumbents
Kaka Bag-ao (Dinagat Islands)
Running for Governor of Dinagat Islands. Bag-ao won.
Teddy Baguilat (Ifugao)
Running for Governor of Ifugao. Baguilat lost.
Jorge Banal (Quezon City–3rd)
Leopoldo Bataoil (Pangasinan–2nd)
Feliciano Belmonte Jr. (Quezon City–4th)
Belmonte would retire from politics after his term ended in 2019, according to his daughter, Quezon City Vice Mayor Joy Belmonte.
Imelda Calixto-Rubiano (Pasay)
Running for Mayor of Pasay under PDP–Laban. Calixto-Rubiano won.
Jose Carlos Cari (Leyte–5th)
Winnie Castelo (Quezon City–2nd)
Running for Councilor of the 2nd District of Quezon City under Serbisyo sa Bayan Party. Castelo won.
Ronald Cosalan (Benguet)
Raul Daza (Northern Samar–1st)
Rogelio Espina (Biliran)
Running for Governor of Biliran. Espina won.
Ana Cristina Go (Isabela–2nd)
Miro Quimbo (Marikina–2nd)
Quimbo would have run for Mayor of Marikina, later, he decided not to run.
Carlo Lopez (Manila–2nd)
Rene Relampagos (Bohol–1st)
Running for Vice Governor of Bohol under the National Unity Party. Relampagos won.
Linabelle Ruth Villarica (Bulacan–4th)
Running for Mayor of Meycauayan, Bulacan under PDP–Laban.
LPG Marketers Association incumbents
Arnel Ty (party-list)
Nacionalista Party incumbents
Florencio Flores Jr. (Bukidnon–2nd)
Seth Frederick "Bullet" Jalosjos (Zamboanga del Norte–1st)
running for Governor of Zamboanga del Norte; lost to Roberto Uy.
Imelda Marcos (Ilocos Norte–2nd) 
running for Governor of Ilocos Norte, later withdrew
Nationalist People's Coalition incumbents
Pedro Acharon Jr. (South Cotabato–1st)
Mercedes Alvarez (Negros Occidental–6th)
In 2017, Alvarez said she plans to retire from politics after finishing her term. She denied reports of her running for local posts in Hinoba-an, and that there were no offers to her yet for provincial-level positions.
Eleanor Bulut-Begtang (Apayao)
Running for Governor of Apayao. Bulut-Begtang won unopposed. 
Napoleon Dy (Isabela–3rd)
Running for Governor of Isabela
Aurora Enerio-Cerilles (Zamboanga del Sur–2nd)
Running for Governor of Zamboanga del Sur; lost to Victor Yu.
Marlyn Primicias-Agabas (Pangasinan–6th)

National Unity Party incumbents
Romeo Acop (Antipolo–2nd)
Benhur Salimbangon (Cebu–4th)
Randolph Ting (Cagayan–3rd)
Partido Demokratiko Pilipino-Lakas ng Bayan incumbents
Jorge Almonte (Misamis Occidental–1st)
Rolando Andaya Jr. (Camarines Sur–1st)
Running for Governor of Camarines Sur. Andaya lost.
Alfredo Benitez (Negros Occidental–3rd)
Nancy Catamco (Cotabato–3rd)
Running for Governor of Cotabato. Catamco won.
Arnel Cerafica (Taguig–1st/Pateros)
Running for Mayor of Taguig. Cerafica lost.
Dakila Cua (Quirino)
First rumored to run for senator of the Philippines, running for Governor of Quirino.
Arthur Defensor Jr. (Iloilo–3rd)
Running for Governor of Iloilo. Defensor won
Ben Evardone (Eastern Samar)
Running for Governor of Eastern Samar. Evardone won.
Rodolfo Fariñas (Ilocos Norte–1st)
Retired from politics, withdrew from running for Governor of Ilocos Norte.
Salvio Fortuno (Camarines Sur–5th)
Mylene Garcia Albano (Davao City–2nd)
Fernando Gonzalez (Albay–3rd)
Scott Davies Lanete (Masbate–3rd)
Running for Governor of Masbate under the Nationalist People's Coalition. Lanete lost.
Roy Loyola (Cavite–5th)
Running for Mayor of Carmona, Cavite, under the Nationalist People's Coalition. Loyola won.
Gloria Macapagal Arroyo (Pampanga–2nd)
Arroyo said that she would retire after the end of her term.
Karlo Nograles (Davao City–1st)
Later appointed as Cabinet Secretary
Rosenda Ann Ocampo (Manila–6th)
Evelyn Plaza-Mellana (Agusan del Sur–2nd)
Maria Valentina Plaza (Agusan del Sur–1st)
Running for Governor of Agusan del Sur under the Partido Demokratiko Sosyalista ng Pilipinas. Plaza lost.
Jesus Sacdalan (Cotabato–1st)
Cesar Sarmiento (Catanduanes)
Bai Sandra Sema (Maguindanao–1st)
Deogracias Ramos Jr. (Sorsogon–2nd)
Jerry Treñas (Iloilo City)
Running for Mayor under the National Unity Party. Treñas won.
Reynaldo Umali (Oriental Mindoro–2nd)
Running for Governor under the Partido Federal ng Pilipinas. Umali lost.
Peter Unabia (Misamis Oriental–1st)
Arthur C. Yap (Bohol–3rd)
Running for Governor. Yap won.
Maria Carmen Zamora (Compostela Valley–1st)
Running for Vice Governor under the Hugpong ng Pagbabago. Zamora won unopposed.
Trade Union Congress Party incumbents
Raymond Democrito Mendoza (party-list)
Independent incumbent
Toby Tiangco (Navotas)
Running for Mayor of Navotas under Partido Navoteño. Tiangco won.

Retiring
These representatives are not term limited, but did not run:
Vicente Alcala (PDP–Laban, Quezon-2nd)
Ran and lost for Governor of Quezon.
Arlene Arcillas (PDP–Laban, Laguna-1st)
Ran and won for Mayor of Santa Rosa, Laguna.
 Jennifer Austria-Barzaga (NUP, Cavite 4th)
Ran and won for Mayor of Dasmariñas, Cavite.
Ferjenel Biron (National Unity Party, Iloilo-4th)
Ran and lost for Governor of Iloilo.
 Pia Cayetano, (Nacionalista, Taguig–2nd)
Ran and won for senator.
Vincent Crisologo (PDP–Laban, Quezon City–1st)
Ran and lost for Mayor of Quezon City.
 Anna Katrina Enverga-dela Paz (NPC, Quezon-1st)
Running for reelection, later withdrew
 Gwendolyn Garcia (PDP–Laban, Cebu–3rd)
Ran and won for Governor of Cebu.
 Alexandra Gonzales (PDP–Laban, Mandaluyong)
Running for reelection, later withdrew
 Datu Zajid Mangudadatu (PDP–Laban, Maguindanao-2nd)
Ran and lost for senator
Danilo Suarez (Lakas, Quezon-3rd)
Ran and won for Governor of Quezon.
Chiqui Roa-Puno (NUP, Antipolo-1st)
Not running for reelection
 Monsour del Rosario (PDP–Laban, Makati-1st)
Ran and lost for Vice Mayor of Makati.
 Gustavo Tambunting (PDP–Laban, Parañaque–2nd)
Running for reelection, later withdrew

Mid-term vacancies
These congressmen left office before their terms expired, and were not replaced. As the 17th Congress has not called for special elections, these seats remain vacant until the sine die adjournment. For party-list representatives, the next person on the list would assume office. In both instances this happened, the next person on the list replaced the person who resigned.
Tupay Loong (NUP, Sulu-1st)
Died on June 30, 2016, before taking his oath of office.
Mark Villar (Nacionalista, Las Piñas)
Resigned after appointed as Secretary of Public Works and Highways on August 1, 2016.
Jum Jainudin Akbar (Liberal, Basilan)
Died on November 11, 2016.
Maximo Dalog (Liberal, Mountain Province)
Died on June 3, 2017.
Henedina Abad (Liberal, Batanes)
Died on October 8, 2017.

Marginal seats
These are the marginal seats that had a winning margin of 5% or less, in ascending order.

Held by PDP–Laban

Held by other parties

Results

Congressional district results

Result by congressional district 

Notes

Party-list election

Summary

Defeated incumbents

District representatives

Party-list representatives

Serbisyo sa Bayan Party
Ricky Belmonte
Angkla
Jesulito Manalo
Akbayan
Tomasito Villarin
YACAP
Benhur Lopez Jr.
Butil
Cecilia Leonila Chavez
Anakpawis
Ariel Casilao
ANAC-IP
Jose Panganiban Jr.
AGRI
Delphine Lee
Orestes Salon

MATA
Tricia Nicole Velasco-Catera
1-CARE
Carlos Roman Uybarreta
1-ANG EDUKASYON
Salvador Belaro Jr.
Aangat Tayo
Harlin Neil Abayon III
AASENSO
Teodoro Montoro
Agbiag!
Michelle Antonio
ABS
Ulysses Garces

References

2019 Philippine general election
2019
May 2019 events in the Philippines